List of people on the postage stamps of the Faroe Islands reflects people of inportance to the history and society of Faroe Islands. The Postverk Føroya have chosen an issuing policy where stamp designs are relevant to the islands themselves. The Faroese government uses stamps to build a profile of the country's history, culture, nature and economy.

The Faroe Isles issued their first stamps on January 30, 1975. As the isles are an independent part of Denmark, Danish stamps were used on the isles previous to this date. From a philatelic point of view, there are earlier events of interest in the postal history of the Faroe Islands, but their first stamps came in 1975.

List of people

References

Source 

 Stamps by year, Posta Faroe Islands
 Famous people on stamps of the Faroe Islands sorted by year, colnect.com

Lists of Faroese people
Faroe Islands
People